() is in Japanese martial arts the person who "receives" a technique. The exact role of uke varies between the different arts and often within the art itself depending on the situation.  For instance, in aikido, judo kata, and bujinkan ninjutsu, uke initiates an attack against their partner, who then defends, whereas in competition judo, there is no designated uke.

An uke typically partners with a partner or nominal opponent. The latter person may be referred to by any of several terms, again depending on the art or situation.

Ukemi
The action of uke is called "taking ."  Literally translated as "receiving body", it is the art of knowing how to respond correctly to an attack and often incorporates skills to allow one to do so safely. These skills can include moves similar to tumbling and are often used as a valid exercise in itself. In aikido and judo training for instance, many classes begin with ukemi training as conditioning.

Forms
  /  - a forward roll from the leading foot's shoulder to the hip on the opposite side.
  /  - a forward breakfall. This can be in the form of a hard slapping breakfall or more of a forward roll like motion. There are subtleties in the different types of forward roll but the principle is that when being thrown forwards the uke (person being thrown) is able to roll out of danger in preference to sustaining an injury.
  /  - a backwards roll or fall.
  /  - a sideways fall.
  /  /  - more of a forward flip than a roll, a cross between yoko (landing) and mae ukemi (initiation), often used in response to wrist throws. Tobu (跳ぶ or 飛ぶ) is the Japanese verb for "to jump" and "to fly".

Correct ukemi will allow the uke to suffer the least amount of damage possible from a fall. If done correctly, the force of hitting the ground will be spread out along non-critical parts of the ukes body. By properly doing ukemi, the uke can roll out of danger and move into their next course of action without being damaged too much by hitting the ground.

References

Japanese martial arts terminology
Aikido
Judo
Jujutsu